Koci may refer to:

 Kočí, Czech surname
 Kočí, Czech Republic
 Koći, a village in Montenegro
 Koçi, Albanian surname
 Koci Cliffs, an Antarctic cliff

See also
Kuci (disambiguation)